Pamela Jean Hopkins (later Hardwicke; born 18 September 1953) is a British gymnast. She competed at the 1972 Summer Olympics, as part of the GB team that finished 18th. She finished 114th in the individual event. She was a member of the Penarth gymnastics club and was trained by Gwynedd Lingard.

References

External links
 

1953 births
Living people
British female artistic gymnasts
Olympic gymnasts of Great Britain
Gymnasts at the 1972 Summer Olympics
Sportspeople from Cardiff
20th-century British women